Belmond Orcaella was a river cruiser in Myanmar that plies the Ayeyarwady River, also known as the Irrawaddy River, and the Chindwin River. Its ports of call include Myanmar’s largest city, Yangon, Bagan and Mandalay. It visited remote villages and temples close to Myanmar’s border with India. It was named after the Orcaella river dolphin found in this part of Asia.
The river cruiser was designed in the style of the Irrawaddy Flotilla Company and launched by Orient-Express Hotels in July 2013. In 2014 the company changed its name to Belmond Ltd, and the ship was renamed Belmond Orcaella. The river cruiser is no longer in operation.

References

External links 
Official website
Belmond.com

River cruise ships